Melicope indica is a species of plant in the family Rutaceae. It is endemic to India.

References

Flora of India (region)
indica
Endangered plants
Taxonomy articles created by Polbot